CJ or similar may refer to:

Businesses
BA CityFlyer (IATA airline designator)
China Northern Airlines (IATA airline designator)
CJ Group (also known as Cheil Jedang), a South Korean conglomerate
CJ CheilJedang, South Korean food and beverage company within the CJ Group

In law
Chief Justice, an honorific title for the presiding member of a Supreme Court
Criminal justice

People
For people named C.J., see C. J. (given name)

Publications
The Classical Journal (Journal of the Classical Association of the Middle West and South)
The Courier-Journal, a newspaper in Louisville, Kentucky, United States

In science and technology
Cangjie input method, a system by which Chinese characters may be entered into a computer using a standard keyboard
Centijoule, an SI unit of energy equal to 10−2 J
Jeep CJ (Civilian Jeep) series, a military-based off-road vehicle
Cessna CitationJet, a line of business jets by Cessna Aircraft Company

Other uses
Congregation of Jesus or Congregatio Jesu, a Catholic congregation
Cluj County, on the vehicle registration plates of Romania

See also
 Creutzfeldt–Jakob disease